Shenoy is a surname from coastal Karnataka and Goa in India. It is found among Hindus of the Goud Saraswat Brahmin community following Smartha Sampradaya of Kavale Matha or Madhva Sampradaya of either Gokarna Matha or Kashi Matha.

Some Brahmin Christian families of South Canara have reverted to their pre-conversion surnames like Shenoy.

Etymology

There are two theories about the origin of Shenoy or Shenvi.

 The Sanskrit word Shrenipati, meaning the leader of the guild, which got converted as Shennivayi in Apabhraṃśa, and later as Shenai or Shenvi in old Konkani.
 It is from the Sanskrit word for 96, ṣaṇṇavati (षण्णवति). The significance of the word 96 among Konkanis is that 96 villages formed the core region of Goa. It is said that 96 clans / families of Saraswat Brahmins arrived in Gomantak and settled in one village each. 66 villages were in Sashti region (66 in Sanskrit is ṣaṭ ṣaṣṭi - षट् षष्टि. Sashti became Salcette during the Portuguese rule) and 30 villages were in Tiswadi region.

Background and origins

The Shenoys were generally involved in administration of the city. The word 'Shenoy' itself means a writer. GSBs were administrators of the temples. The word 'Shenoy' is also interchangeable with its counterpart 'Shanbhag'

The Saraswats migrated from Goa during the Muslim and Christian conquests during 1600, and carried their surname with them. Thus the word 'शणै' is transliterated in Latin script as Shenoy in Karnataka and as Xennai, Shenoi, Shenai, Shenvi or even Sinai in Goa. Xennoi is less commonly used in the erstwhile Portuguese Goa and Damaon, but nowadays it has given way to Xennai today.

It was common in Goa for Shenoys and other Saraswats to add the name of their ancestral village or title after Shenoy to denote their origin.

Notable people

The following is a list of notable people with the surname 'Shenoy', 'Shanbhag'.
 Aishwarya Nag: Originally Aishwarya Nagendra Shenoy, South Indian actress
 Arun Shenoy: composer and music producer who has received a Grammy Award nomination
 Basti Vaman Shenoy: Konkani activist and founder of World Konkani Centre in Mangalore
 Prathima Devi: Kannada actress, wife of D. Shankar Singh, mother of Rajendra Singh Babu
 Preeti Shenoy: artist and writer
 Samskruthy Shenoy: actress who has appeared in South Indian films
 Shenoi Goembab (1877–1946): Konkani Pandit
Krishna V. Shenoy Hong Seh and Vivian W.M. Lim Professor in the School of Engineering, Stanford University.
 Suresh V. Shenoy: executive and philanthropist
 Vasudev V Shenoy (1940 – 2015): Educationist, Educational Counsellor, Journalist and a Social Activist
 Vijay Balakrishna Shenoy: Professor of physics and recipient of the Shanti Swarup Bhatnagar Prize, the highest science award in India
 Prashant Shenoy: Distinguished Professor of Computer Science at the University of Massachusetts Amherst
 T. V. R. Shenoy: Journalist, editor, and columnist

References

Further reading
History : Goud Saraswat Brahmin
The Hindu : Magazine / Heritage : Wild dreams take shape
Hindu Entrepreneurship in Goan History by Teotonio R. de Souza
Goa-Karnataka Nexus through the Centuries by K. L. Kamat

Indian surnames
Karnataka society
Goan society
Konkani
Konkani-language surnames
Social groups of Goa